Deyrintar (Dayr Antar, Deir Intar) is a small village in Southern Lebanon in the  Bint Jbeil District in Nabatieh Governorate.

Geography

Its main features include a cave, a main square, and 3 mosques.

Location
The village is surrounded several villages including: Tebnine, As-Sultaniyah, Bir El Sanasel, Majadel, Mahrouna, Mazraat Mechref, Hariss, Kafr Dunin, and other southern villages.

Origin of name
E. H. Palmer wrote that the name means "the convent of arches".

History
In 1875 Victor Guérin visited and found here 160 Metualis. He further noted: "Most of the houses show a mixture of old hewn stones and modern materials without character. Several tombs, cisterns, a great press, with two compartments, and a rock-cut tank point to a period of more or less antiquity.'

In 1881, the PEF's Survey of Western Palestine (SWP) described it as: A village, built of stone, containing about 150 Metawileh, situated on a hill, surrounded by olives, fig-trees, and arable land, with waters supplied from birket and cisterns.

Families
 House of Yassine
 House of Hojeij or Hajaig
 House of Sheayto
 House of Al-atrash
 House of Nasserdinne
 House of Mehssin al-madi
 House of Mehfara
 House of Abou raya
 House of Moujir
 House of Al-dayekh
 House of Kassir
 House of Al-attar
 House of Sheaytille

Municipal
Mayor: Mr. Kassem Hjeij or hojeij

Monuments
The most prominent landmarks:
 Beaufort bees
 Ein Zarka
 The cave

Religious monuments
There are mosques:
 Mosque Imam Mahdi (Almallule)
 Mosque Imam Hussein (Al-Barakah)
 Mosque Imam Ali (Al-shajara)
 Mosque Al-Hamra

The Imam or khatib of Deyrintar are:
 Sheikh Houssain Alatrash
 Sheikh Haitham Youssef Hjej

Civilian facilities
 The municipal building
 Shiite shrine
 The public square

References

Bibliography

External links
Survey of Western Palestine, Map 2:   IAA, Wikimedia commons
Deir Ntar, Localiban 

Populated places in Bint Jbeil District
Shia Muslim communities in Lebanon